CGO may refer to:
Carlson, Gaskey & Olds: an intellectual property firm based in Birmingham, Michigan
Catalogue of Galactic O Stars, an astronomical catalogue
Central Gilts Office
Ceria gadolinium oxide (used in Solid Oxide Fuel cells (SOFC))
CGO Ecology Limited, a UK-based ecological consultancy business
Cgo, a subsystem in the Go programming language which enables the creation of Go packages that call C code
Chief governance officer
Chief governing officer
Company-grade officer
Chief growth officer
Royal Concertgebouw Orchestra, a symphony orchestra of the Netherlands
Zhengzhou Xinzheng International Airport (IATA: CGO)
Cambridge Graduate Orchestra at Cambridge, UK
International Symposium on Code Generation and Optimization
Republic of the Congo (FIFA and IOC code: CGO)